Hans Theodor Bucherer  (19 May 1869 – 29 May 1949) was a German chemist and gave name to several chemical reactions, for example the Bucherer carbazole synthesis, the Bucherer reaction, and the Bucherer–Bergs reaction

Life
Bucherer started studying chemistry at the University of Munich,  University of Karlsruhe and later with Johannes Wislicenus at the University of Leipzig. After he received his Ph.D in 1893 he worked at BASF. He became professor at Technical University of Dresden in 1901 changed to the Technical University of Berlin in 1913 and became professor at the Technical University of Munich in 1926.

References
  

1869 births
1949 deaths
20th-century German chemists
Academic staff of the Technical University of Munich
19th-century German chemists